The D+D Real Czech Challenge is a golf tournament on the Challenge Tour played in the Czech Republic. From 2012 to 2018, and from 2021 it was played at the Golf&Spa Kunětická Hora in Dříteč. It moved to the Kaskáda Golf Resort, near Kuřim, in 2019.

Winners

References

External links
Coverage on the Challenge Tour's official site

Challenge Tour events
Golf tournaments in the Czech Republic